Rabanales is a municipality located in the province of Zamora, Castile and León, Spain. According to the 2004 census (INE), the municipality has a population of 767 inhabitants.

Town hall
Rabanales is home to the town hall of 6 villages:
Rabanales (191 inhabitants, INE 2020).
Grisuela (98 inhabitants, INE 2020).
Matellanes (94 inhabitants, INE 2020).
Fradellos (50 inhabitants, INE 2020).
Mellanes (41 inhabitants, INE 2020).
Ufones (27 inhabitants, INE 2020).

References 

Municipalities of the Province of Zamora